Shigezhuang Subdistrict is a subdistrict situated on southern Changping District, Beijing, China. It borders Shahe Town to the north, Dingxiaokou Town to the east, Huilongguan and Longzeyuan Subdistricts to the southeast, and Xibeiwang Town to the southwest. In 2020, the population of Shigezhuang was 64,910.

History

Administrative divisions 

In the year 2021, Shigezhuang Subdistrict was divided into 9 subdivisions, where 4 of them were communities, and 5 were villages:

Gallery

See also 

 List of township-level divisions of Beijing

References 

Changping District
Subdistricts of Beijing